Klaus Stärk (born 1954) is a football coach from Germany.

Coaching career
He went to Afghanistan from the German Football Association in 2004 in order to develop the national team. Stärk has been in charge of coaching Afghanistan National Team since 2005 and has also been coaching women's football in the country.

Under him, the national team has seen improvements, and the Afghans qualified for the 2008 AFC Challenge Cup ahead of favourites Kyrgyzstan.

After he could not qualify the national team for the ASEAN Football Championship, he resigned.

References

External links
Afghanistan take on Maldives, Pakistan face Sri Lanka in openers: 2005 SAFF Championship begins today
Interview
Stark reality for Afghan football

1954 births
Living people
German football managers
FC Astana-1964 managers
Expatriate football managers in Afghanistan
Afghanistan national football team managers